The FED is a Soviet rangefinder camera, mass-produced from 1934 until around 1996, and also the name of the factory that made it.

The factory emerged from the small workshops of the Children's labour commune named after Felix Edmundovich Dzerzhinsky (the acronym of which gave name to the factory and its products) in December 1927 in Kharkiv (Soviet Ukraine, now Ukraine). Initially the factory was managed by the head of the commune Anton Makarenko and produced simple electrical machinery (drills). In 1932, the new managing director of the factory, A.S. Bronevoy (Russian: А.С. Броневой), came up with the idea of producing a copy of the German Leica camera.

From 1955 FED began to innovate, combining the rangefinder with the viewfinder in the FED 2 and all its successors. The FED-3 added slow shutter speeds and on the later version FED-3 (b) the film advance was changed from a thumbwheel to a lever. The FED 4 (1964–77) added a non-coupled selenium exposure meter. The FED 5 marked the end of the FED rangefinder family and was meant as a replacement for both the FED-3 and FED-4, which were in production at the time of its introduction. There were versions of the FED-5: the original FED-5 had an exposure meter, the FED-5B was a cheaper version without meter and the later FED-5C had reflected framelines showing field of view of 50mm lens and an exposure meter. All FED-5 cameras were delivered with an Industar I-61L/D lens. Production of FED rangefinder cameras ended in the mid 1990s. Fed-5 Serial Number 545446 was made on 28 February 1994; Fed's site claims that it was in fact 1997: 
"Start of serial production of vertical drive for control system of tanks. Production of all types of camera has stopped. 8,647,000 cameras were manufactured since the beginning." This may be accurate as there are FED-5 cameras in existence with serial numbers up to at least 596692.

FED 1 collector information
The following types are nomenclature used by collectors since no FED 1 or Fedka camera was actually marked in this way. Brief descriptions are included to help with identification.

1a 1934–1935 SN 31- 6000 (some sights have been done on early style, read 1a, cameras up to number 6500. 

1b 1935–1937 SN 6000 – 55000 – Some with the NKVD engraving "Peoples Commissariat of Internal Affairs", which was the new name for Stalin's secret police. 

1c 1937–1939 SN 55000 – 125000 – In 1937 a triangular cam-follower replaced the circular Leica-type cam follower and the speed dial was modified slightly to resemble the Leica II. 

S 1938–1941 – Identical to 1c except that 2000 cameras were produced with a faster 1/1000" shutter speed.

V (B) 1938 – Identical to 1c except with a faster 1/1000" second shutter speed and a slow-speed dial. 

1d 1939–1941 (August) SN 125000 – 180000 – Identifiable by the centre retaining screw being off-centre and not concealed by the lens-mount flange. In addition, in 1939 Ukraine lost its nominal independence from Russia and camera engraving changed to highlight this from UkSSR to USSR.

1d 1942–1945 SN 174000 – 178000 – Around 4000 cameras manufactured in Berdsk from parts evacuated from the FED Ukraine factory before it was overrun by the Nazis.

1e SN 174000 – 180000 – Manufactured in Berdsk in Siberia in the first few months of 1946 after hostilities ended, using parts made before the war. 

T Engraved "Red Flag"  in honour of new masters produced around SN 200000 and was fitted with a coated 50 mm  Industar 10 lens

1f 1949–1953 SN 201800 – 400000 – New cursive-script Fed logo, flatter shutter button, coated lens engraved with what were then called the international f stops,  and so on rather than the earlier , . 

1949–1950 TSVVS –  Two major circulating theories is that the cameras has either been manufactured at Moscow's Almaz factory or it had been ordered for manufacture by the Soviets from East Germany (possibly Zeiss, but it is also not confirmed). This camera is probably the most mysterious in nature out of all Soviet cameras.  An old belief that this camera was made by FED factory is disputed by the fact that the body is wholly made out of brass and it is different dimensions physically than the FED-1 cameras. (see forum discussions at USSRPhoto.com for more detailed arguments about it between various Soviet camera experts).

1g 1953–1955 SN 400000 – 800000 – Shutter speeds changed to 25th, 50th,100th instead of old Leica 20th, 30th, 40th, 60th.

FED 1 serial numbers and production numbers
1934 SN 000031 - 004000  -  4k
1935 SN 004001 - 016000  - 12k
1936 SN 016001 - 031000  - 15k
1937 SN 031001 - 053000  - 22k
1938 SN 053001 - 082000  - 29k
1939 SN 082001 - 116000  - 34k
1940 SN 116001 - 148000  - 32k
1941 SN 148001 - 175000  - 25k
1942 - 45   (World War 2)     - see below
1946 SN 175001 - 176000  - 1k - see below
1947 SN 176001 - 186000  - 10k
1948 SN 186001 - 203000  - 13k
1949 SN 203001 - 221000  - 18k
1950 SN 221001 - 248000  - 27k
1951 SN 248001 - 289000  - 41k
1952 SN 289001 - 341000  - 53k
1953 SN 341001 - 424000  - 73k
1954 SN 424001 - 560000  - 136k
1955 SN 560001 - 700000  - 140k
V (B) 1938                              - 40
S 1938 - 41                           -  2k
1983 SN 104442 - 9377287 -150k
These serial numbers and production numbers are approximate. During World War II production was shifted to Siberia as the factory in Kharkiv was overrun by Nazi German forces. During this period and immediately after the war some serial numbers between 174000 - 180000 were used on cameras built in Berdsk in Siberia, even in the first few months of 1946.

FED 1 lens type information

100 mm  Fed lens first made in 1938.
50 mm  Industar-10 copy of the Leitz Elmar 50 mm  manufactured 1934–1946 and fitted to most FED 1a, 1b, 1c and 1d. Old-style apertures , . 
50 mm  Fed copy of Leitz Summar 1938–1941. 
A number of 50 mm  macro lenses existed.

FED 1 technical specifications, 1934 (or Fedka)
Copy of the Leica II.
Manufactured 1934–1955 (spec as 1934 Fedka).
Shutter is cloth focal-plane.
Shutter speeds: Z - 20th, 30th, 40th, 60th, 100th, 200th, 500th.
Focusing: 1.25 M to infinity.
Coupled range finder with a separate viewfinder.
Film is standard 35mm.
Loading via a removable bottom.
Weight is approximately 630 g.

Notes
1948 or 1949 onwards Industar-10 lens with "international" f stops, 
1953 onwards Shutter speeds changed to 25th, 50th, 100th, 200th, 500th.

References

External links 

 Film about FED company history "To be the first!" (Rus)
 The FED company site (Rus)
 FED General Information (Rus)
 FED company history (Rus)
 Rangefinder cameras of the Soviet era
 Faraway, yet so close "Are Leica LTM lenses really compatible with Soviet LTM bodies?"
 Industar 26 and 61 Relubing
 rus-camera 
 Exact Soviet Leica II copy the FED 1 or Fedka camera c. 1934 by Stephen Rothery
 Soviet development of Leica II concept the FED 2 c. 1955 by Stephen Rothery
 FED cameras Price Guide completed auction prices
 Zorki Survival Site by Jay Javier
 USSRPhoto.com Wiki catalog entries for the FED-1 cameras. Use left navigation to see other FED models
 Oscar Fricke: The Dzerzhinsky Commune: Birth of the Soviet 35 mm Camera Industry

Soviet cameras
Defunct photography companies
Photography companies of Russia